Symphony No. 17 can refer to:

Symphony No. 17 (Brian) by Havergal Brian
Symphony No. 17 (Haydn)
Symphony No. 17 (Michael Haydn)
Symphony No. 17 (Mozart)
Symphony No. 17 (Myaskovsky) by Nikolai Myaskovsky

017